"Geronimo" is a song by Danish singer-songwriter Aura Dione from her second studio album, Before the Dinosaurs. The song was released as the album's lead single on 19 September 2011. "Geronimo" is a pop song with folk elements, with critics comparing the song's arrangement to Shakira. It was written by Aura Dione, David Jost, Joachim, Ian O'Brien-Docker, Michael Lowdst, Andrei Georgescu, and Thomas Troelsen, and it was produced by David Jost, DamienDamien and Joachim Persson. According to Aura, the song is about staying true to yourself and living out your dreams, and is one of her favourite songs on the album.

It became Dione's first number-one single in both Austria and her native Denmark, and her second in Germany. Dione is also the first Danish artist to debut at number one in Germany. The song charted at number seven in Switzerland, becoming Dione's highest-charting single since "I Will Love You Monday (365)" (2010).

Track listing 
Danish digital download
"Geronimo" (Jost & Damien Radio Mix) – 3:15

Danish digital download – remixes
"Geronimo" (Martin Roth Clubmix) – 6:43
"Geronimo" (The Disco Boys Remix) – 5:38
"Geronimo" (The Disco Boys Remix Edit) – 3:23
"Geronimo" (LTM Slowdown Remix) – 8:12

German digital EP
"Geronimo" (Jost & Damien Radio Mix) – 3:15
"Geronimo" (The Disco Boys Remix Edit) – 3:23
"Geronimo" (The Disco Boys Remix) – 5:38
"Geronimo" (LTM Slowdown Remix) – 8:12
"Call Messiah" (Aura Dione, Per Ebdrup) – 6:53

German CD single
"Geronimo" (Jost & Damien Radio Mix)
"Geronimo" (The Disco Boys Remix)

Credits and personnel 
Aura Dione – songwriter, vocals
David Jost – songwriter, producer, mixing, vocal recording, guitar, programming
Joachim Persson – songwriter, producer, mixing, programming
Ian O'Brien-Docker – songwriter, producer, guitar, keys, programming
Thomas Troelsen – songwriter, vocal recording, backing vocals, and keyboards
DamienDamien – producer, mixing
Sebastian Zenke – guitar, programming
Johan Alkenäs – additional keys and programming

Charts and certifications

Weekly Charts

Year-end charts

Certifications

Release history

References

External links 
 Offizielles Musikvideo
 
 

2011 singles
Aura Dione songs
Songs written by Thomas Troelsen
Number-one singles in Austria
Number-one singles in Denmark
Number-one singles in Germany
Songs written by David Jost
Songs written by Aura Dione
2011 songs
Island Records singles
Universal Music Group singles
Songs written by Joacim Persson